Clydesdale (Gaelic: Dail Chluaidh) is a constituency of the Scottish Parliament (Holyrood) covering part of the council area of South Lanarkshire. It elects one Member of the Scottish Parliament (MSP) by the plurality (first past the post) method of election. Also, however, it is one of nine constituencies in the South Scotland electoral region, which elects seven additional members, in addition to nine constituency MSPs, to produce a form of proportional representation for the region as a whole.

The seat has been held by Màiri McAllan of the Scottish National Party since the 2021 Scottish Parliament election.

Electoral region 

The other eight constituencies of the South Scotland region are Ayr, Carrick, Cumnock and Doon Valley, Dumfriesshire, East Lothian, Ettrick, Roxburgh and Berwickshire, Galloway and West Dumfries, Kilmarnock and Irvine Valley and Midlothian South, Tweeddale and Lauderdale.

The region covers the Dumfries and Galloway council area, part of the East Ayrshire council area, part of the East Lothian council area, part of the Midlothian council area, the Scottish Borders council area, the South Ayrshire council area and part of the South Lanarkshire council area.

Constituency boundaries and council area 

The Clydesdale constituency was created at the same time as the Scottish Parliament, in 1999, with the name and boundaries of an  existing Westminster constituency. In 2005, however, Scottish Westminster (House of Commons) constituencies were mostly replaced with new constituencies.

The Holyrood constituency is one of five covering the South Lanarkshire council area. The others are the East Kilbride, Hamilton, Larkhall and Stonehouse, Rutherglen and the Uddingston and Bellshill constituencies, all in other electoral regions.

The electoral wards used in the creation of Clydesdale are listed below. All of these wards are part of South Lanarkshire:

In full: Clydesdale East, Clydesdale North, Clydesdale South, Clydesdale West
In part: Avondale and Stonehouse (shared with Hamilton, Larkhall and Stonehouse)

Member of the Scottish Parliament

Election results

2020s

2010s

2000s

1990s

Footnotes

External links

Constituencies of the Scottish Parliament
1999 establishments in Scotland
Constituencies established in 1999
Scottish Parliament constituencies and regions 1999–2011
Scottish Parliament constituencies and regions from 2011
Politics of South Lanarkshire
Clydesdale
Strathaven
Carluke
Lanark